Wojciech Muzyk (born 7 November 1998) is a Polish professional footballer who plays as a goalkeeper for Siarka Tarnobrzeg.

Career statistics

Club

Honours
Legia Warsaw
Ekstraklasa: 2019–20

References 

1998 births
People from Suwałki
Sportspeople from Podlaskie Voivodeship
Living people
Polish footballers
Association football goalkeepers
Legia Warsaw II players
Legia Warsaw players
Olimpia Grudziądz players
Siarka Tarnobrzeg players
Ekstraklasa players
I liga players
II liga players
III liga players